Orlando Bravo (born 1970) is a Puerto Rican billionaire businessman. He is the co-founder and managing partner of Thoma Bravo, a private equity investment firm that specializes in software and technology-enabled services sectors. The 2019 Forbes 400 listed Bravo as the first Puerto Rican-born billionaire, debuting at No. 287. As of September 2022, his net worth is estimated at US$7.9 billion.

Early life and education 
Bravo was born in Mayagüez, Puerto Rico. When Bravo was in his early teens he moved to Florida to pursue a possible career in tennis, studying at the Nick Bollettieri Tennis Academy, which counts Andre Agassi and Maria Sharapova as alumni. He returned to Puerto Rico to attend high school at the Academia de la Inmaculada Concepción in his hometown. In 1987 he competed in the Omega Easter Bowl tennis tournament held in Miami. After graduating high school Bravo left Puerto Rico to attend Brown University, where he graduated with a B.A. in economics and political science in 1992. Bravo enrolled in graduate school at Stanford University, earning a J.D. from Stanford Law School and an M.B.A. from Stanford's Graduate School of Business.

Career 
Bravo began his professional career working in mergers and acquisitions for Morgan Stanley. In 1997, he joined Thoma Bravo's predecessor firm, Thoma Cressey Equity Partners, Inc. (TCEP.)  Crain's Chicago Business called Carl Thoma's hiring of Bravo "the smartest investment....Thoma ever made." 

In the early 2000s Carl Thoma, a co-founder of the firm, allowed Bravo to lead the acquisition of product distribution software provider Prophet 21. It was the first software deal TCEP had ever done, and one of the earliest take-private transactions in the sector. At the time, Bravo noted it fit TCEP's strategy of buying strong franchises in large and fragmented industries. Because the deal happened when lenders were hesitant to provide capital for such deals, the deal took place with almost no dependence on leverage. Bravo brought in the firm's first operating partner to address the issue of the software companies' running on high gross margins with the potential of decent profitability, but were instead often losing money. After three years Prophet 21 produced a return of 4.7x at exit.

This and other deals led Bravo to become a partner at TCEP, when he was 30 years old. At that time he ran the software group at the company.

TCEP became Thoma Cressey Bravo in 2007, in recognition of Bravo's contribution to the firm's success.

In 2008, Orlando Bravo helped form Thoma Bravo, LLC, when the firm changed its name and investment focus.

Thoma Bravo 

Thoma Bravo is one of the top technology buyout firms in the United States, and along with predecessor firms Thoma Cressey Bravo and Thoma Cressey Equity Partners, the firm has completed more than 200 software and technology acquisitions (over 60 platform companies and over 140 add-ons) representing an aggregate value of about $57 billion in enterprise value. Some of Thoma Bravo's current and past portfolio companies include Deltek, Blue Coat, Qlik, and SolarWinds.

In 2016 the firm closed its Fund XII, raising $7.6 billion, twice the size of its previous fund. Bravo referred to this fund when he discussed how the firm evolved from a generalist private equity firm into a private equity software specialist. Thoma Bravo raised $12.6 billion for its 13th flagship fund, which was announced in January 2019.

In February, the French business school HEC Paris, in conjunction with Dow Jones, named Thoma Bravo the best-performing buyout investor in the world after studying 898 funds raised between 2005 and 2014. According to public data analyzed by Forbes, its funds returned 30% net annually, and since the beginning of 2015, Thoma Bravo has sold or listed 25 investments worth a total of $20 billion, four times their cost.

Thoma Bravo is estimated to be worth $7 billion and has done 230 software deals worth over $68 billion since 2003 and presently oversees a portfolio of 38 software companies that generate some $12 billion in annual revenue and employ 40,000 people.

Up until its move to Miami in 2020, Bravo ran the San Francisco office, while Thoma was based in Chicago.

Philanthropy 
Bravo is a member of the Board of Trustees of Brown University and serves on Brown's President's Leadership Council. Bravo is a member of the Stanford Graduate School of Business (GSB) Bay Area Chapter, Stanford GSB Latino Alumni Chapter, Stanford Law School San Francisco Chapter and Stanford Latino Alumni Association. He is on the board of Border Youth Tennis Exchange (BYTE), a charitable organization founded to enhance the lives of children and young adults on the Mexico–United States border through tennis, education and cross-border exchange. Bravo serves on the UCSF Board of Overseers. Bravo and his wife have helped endow faculty scholar and fellow positions at Stanford University's Sean N. Parker Center for Allergy Research. In April 2019, Bravo committed a $25 million gift to Brown University that will establish two professorships and the Orlando Bravo Center for Economics Research. The Orlando Bravo Center for Economics Research is housed in the Department of Economics and supports innovative research, training and collaborative projects for economic scholars including supporting faculty research, graduate students and undergraduate students.

In the wake of Hurricane Maria, which devastated the island of Puerto Rico,  Bravo donated $10 million through the Bravo Family Foundation's Podemos Puerto Rico Fund (Spanish for, "We Can Puerto Rico"). Aid included chartering planes to carry cargo, including satellite phones, water, water purifiers, medicine and diapers. This donation was the largest single donation to the hurricane relief efforts, with Bravo criticizing the Trump administration's slow recovery aid measures, writing in an official statement "[t]here will hopefully be significant federal aid coming to the island. But centralized efforts, no matter how large and well-coordinated, still leave gaps." He originally donated "$2 million to start and up to $8 million in the [following] months." On 30 September he "boarded a plane with water purifiers and medical supplies," asserting that "[i]f we can come from San Francisco, California, and in two days deliver what the mayors of two towns desperately need, [t]hen it can be done." Bravo arrived at the Rafael Hernández Airport with his brother, Alejandro, taking supplies for the mayors of Lares, Mayagüez, and San Germán, and for the La Concepción hospital in the lattermost municipality. It was a Primera Hora news report that revealed that a fifty-person refuge was running out of water in the formermost municipality. His foundation had visited San Juan a few days prior, while his visit was the first carried out since the launch of their Ayudando a Puerto Rico (Spanish for, "Helping Puerto Rico") initiative. The products they donated included "serums, water, water filters, satellite phones and a special milk for a baby from a family in San Sebastián." Following this "targeted mission", in which Bravo revealed that "[i]t’s much worse than was reported," he stated his plan to return in November, while the foundation would go back the following week, "working literally 24-7," as they had received thousands of aid requests. That November, Bravo announced raising an additional $10 million from investors, as well as another $5 million himself. The investors donations "came from private equity investors Bravo knows," such as Bain Capital's managing director Ian Loring, Blackstone Group's global head of private equity Joe Baratta, J-P Conte chairman and managing director of Genstar, Kirkland & Ellis, KKR, which "made a firm-wide donation," Hollie Moore Haynes managing partner of Luminate Capital and Silver Lake co-founder and former-chairman Dave Roux. These funds enabled a series of frequent flights taking relief aid to Puerto Rico. Bravo-led relief efforts were organized as "a private-equity firm does with a portfolio company."

In May 2019, Bravo donated $100 million to the Bravo Family Foundation to promote entrepreneurship and economic development in Puerto Rico, a program that was put "on hold until living conditions stabilize" due to the Hurricane Maria efforts. After the hurricane, his "longer-term plans [were] centered on improving educational standards and providing opportunities for talented young adults in a way that promotes social justice.

Personal life
Bravo is married to Katy Bravo, with four children, and lives in Miami. His brother, Alejandro, is a Florida-based criminal lawyer.

See also

List of Puerto Ricans

References 

Living people
20th-century American businesspeople
21st-century American businesspeople
American chief executives of financial services companies
Stanford Law School alumni
Brown University alumni
American investors
Private equity and venture capital investors
People from Mayagüez, Puerto Rico
Stanford Graduate School of Business alumni
American billionaires
American company founders
1970 births